= Jamaican Federation of Labour =

The Jamaican Federation of Labour was a national trade union federation bringing together trade unions in Jamaica.

In 1917, A. Bain-Alves set up a new union of cigar makers, and led a strike. Bain-Alves also led strikes of longshoremen, coal heavers and banana carriers, setting up unions for each group of workers. He also formed unions for tram workers, match makers, and for hotel workers. The Trade Union Act 1919 legalised unions in Jamaica, although picketing remained illegal, and companies could sue unions or striking workers for breach of contract.

In 1922, Bain-Alves founded the Jamaican Federation of Labor, to bring together the various unions he had founded. A waiters' union founded by A. J. McGlashan also joined. The most important of its affiliates was Longshoremen's Union Number One.

The federation espoused a militant approach to trade unionism. It survived until at least the 1930s.
